Kibirigwi is a settlement in Kenya's Kirinyaga County of the former Central Province. The township is located along the Nairobi, Nyeri highway within Ndia Constituency. Ragati River also passes within parts of Kibirigwi area. Kibirigwi neighbors Kibingoti and Karatina town, the former being in Kirinyaga and the latter being in Nyeri County.

History 
The province is inhabited by the Kikuyu speaking community who are part of the Kenya Eastern Bantu.

During Kenya's colonization by the British, much of the province was regarded as part of the 'White Highlands', for the exclusive use of the settler community. Therefore it saw political activity from the local communities who felt that they had an ancestral right to the land. This tension culminated in the 1950s with the Mau Mau rebellion; it saw the region placed under a state of emergency and the arrest of many prominent political leaders.

Climate 
The climate of Central Province is generally cooler than that of the rest of Kenya, due to the region's higher altitude. Rainfall is fairly reliable, falling in two seasons, one from early March to May (the long rains) and a second during October and November (the short rains).

References 

Populated places in Central Province (Kenya)